Oil of Every Pearl's Un-Insides Non-Stop Remix Album (stylised in all caps) is the only remix album by Scottish recording artist and producer Sophie. It was the final full-length album released during the artist's lifetime. It features alternative versions and remixes of songs from Sophie's debut studio album Oil of Every Pearl's Un-Insides as well as new songs, presented as a non-stop DJ mix.

Release
The album was announced during a red carpet interview at the 61st Annual Grammy Awards. In July 2019, the remix album was released as part of an exclusive 3-CD set limited to 100 copies that includes the dual disc remix album, the original Oil of Every Pearl's Un-Insides album, as well as a clutch bag featuring its artwork. The remix album was later released as two videos on YouTube on 29 July, and then on digital and streaming platforms on 6 September.

Reception
Matt Moen of Paper described the album as featuring "everything from throbbing techno to glitter-dusted house renditions and glossy ambient drones". They singled out "Ponyboy (Faast Boy Remix)", "Faceshopping (Money Mix)", "Whole New World (Doss and Sophie Remix)", and the final five "Infatuation" mixes as standout tracks. Resident Advisor gave the album the "RA Recommends" badge, and in its review Andrew Ryce wrote "The LP offers catharsis through rambunctious beats, sweet melodies and the gnarliest sounds SOPHIE can muster. It brings her themes of searching, self-acceptance and identity directly onto the dance floor, in ways that are as splashy, strange and unforgettable as you'd hope."

In September 2021, upon the release of the Dawn of Chromatica remix album by Lady Gaga, Skye Butchard for Clash described the album as "genius" and wrote "the benchmark set by [the album] for remix albums is a concrete reflection of [SOPHIE's] impact." Tiny Mix Tapes described each disc as "consisting of over 47 minutes of seamless fun".

Track listing

Notes
When added to digital and streaming platforms, "Leeds Heaven And Hell" was renamed to "Pretending (Glasshouse)" and "Infatuation (The Abyss)" was misspelled as "Infutation". Several additional errors were made when the album was released on Apple Music and iTunes in the United Kingdom; the album's title was incorrectly punctuated as "Oil Of Every Pearl's (Un-Insides Non-Stop Remix Album)", and "Faceshopping (Money Mix)" was simply labelled as "Faceshopping".

Release history

References

Sophie (musician) albums
2019 remix albums
Transgressive Records albums